Musicals in Ahoy was a musical show that took place in 2002 in "Ahoy'" in Rotterdam, Netherlands. It was produced by Stage Entertainment/Joop van den Ende Theatreproductions. There were seven shows in a row, with 15.000 sold seats every night. It was a song and dance extravaganza supported by the Dutch Musical Ensemble.

In 2004 they revived this concept with the show Musicals in Ahoy 2004, Musical meets Movie. A run of nine shows. In 2006 they revived this concept again.

Also international stars like Vanessa Williams performed in the Musicals in Ahoy shows.

Cast

References 

2002 musicals